Ravens in Winter is a 1989 book by Bernd Heinrich. It is a study of the behaviour of ravens in the forests of Maine.

Reception
A review of Ravens in Winter by Publishers Weekly wrote "The story related here, which is constructed from his [Heinrich's] field notes, moves slowly; we learn a good deal about scientific methods and a lot about patience. Overall, however, the book is suspenseful and exciting." A New Scientist review summarised the book concluding "It also contains Heinrich's own - and excellent - drawings of the various raven postures, a comprehensive review of the literature, beginning with the Bible, and even a section of the ravens of the Tower of London."

It was an Evergreen Audubon & Nature Center Book of the Month.

Ravens in Winter has also been reviewed by AudioFile, Scientific American, The Condor, The Sewanee Review, and Library Journal.

References

External links
Reviews of Heinrich's books and Heinrich writing about each book
Library holdings of Ravens in Winter

1989 non-fiction books
American non-fiction books
Zoology books
Ornithological literature
Ravens
Natural history of Maine